D 89, also known as Al Maktoum Road, Airport Road or Al Khawaneej Road, is a road in Dubai, United Arab Emirates. One of the longest intra-city roads, D 89 begins at the Deira Corniche and runs perpendicular to D 85 (Baniyas Road).  From Deira, the road progresses south-eastward towards Dubai International Airport, intersecting with E 311 (Emirates Road) past the airport.  It proceeds further south-east towards the localities of Al Khawaneej and Mirdif.

Important landmarks along D 89 include the Deira Corniche, Deira Twin Towers, Dubai International Airport, Al Bustan Rotana Hotel, Le Meridian Hotel, Al Rashidiya Park and Mushrif Park.

References

Roads in the United Arab Emirates
Transport in Dubai